Stockton railway station served the town of Stockton-on-Tees, County Durham, England, from 1825 to 1848 on the Stockton and Darlington Railway.

History 
The station was formally opened on 27 September 1825 by the Stockton and Darlington Railway, although regular passenger services started on 10 October. The services were initially horse drawn but steam services began on 7 September 1833. The station closed on 1 July 1848.

See also
Newport railway station (S&D)
North Road railway station
Head of Steam
Shildon railway station
National Railway Museum Shildon

References 

Disused railway stations in County Durham
Railway stations in Great Britain opened in 1825
Railway stations in Great Britain closed in 1848
1825 establishments in England
1848 disestablishments in England